The Kestrel (1982) is a fantasy novel by American writer Lloyd Alexander, the second of three books often called the Westmark trilogy. The novel won the Parent's Choice Award in fiction for Fall 1982.

It is set in Westmark, "an imaginary kingdom with a post-Napoleonic cast".
Another reviewer has called the series "historical fantasy, set in a time much like our 18th century".

Plot summary

Theo is traveling through Westmark, learning about the country of which he will soon be Prince Consort. He is not surprised to find great poverty: Mickle - now known as Princess Augusta - could have told him that from her years on the street. His friend Florian could have told him about the aristocracy's graft and corruption. But neither could have foreseen a loaded pistol in the practiced hand of the assassin Skeit. The echoes of that shot ring from the muskets and cannons of a Westmark suddenly at war - a war that turns simple, honest men into cold-blooded killers, Mickle into a military commander, and Theo himself into a stranger.

As set up in Westmark, Theo and Mickle are in love.  A corrupt general is in a cabal with a rival country, and plans to surrender after a token resistance, allowing a country with a more aristocratic government to replace the more populist Mickle who is seen as too close to revolutionaries like Florian.  However, although the general surrenders, his soldiers refuse to, and the nominal resistance becomes a full-blown war as the people fight to determine their own destiny.

Similar to how the aristocratic powers of the time invaded France to restore the aristocracy, here a foreign country is meddling in the internal affairs of Westmark.  And just as France repelled the great powers with an army led by the people and of the people, the Westmark forces run by Florian, and his lieutenants, Theo — now the eponymous Kestrel — and Justin, fight to preserve the country.  But becoming a general, a tradesman in blood and death, costs the artistic and conscientious Theo a great deal. He has to cut off pieces of himself in the service of a more pressing need.

Meanwhile, Mickle must run her government in exile.  Musket and his master, Count Las Bombas, are dragged in to serve as her advisors.  She says she wants his advice, as he used to serve with the Salamanca lancers, one of his blustery claims from Westmark.  The character Las Bombas is, like the bard Fflewddur Fflam in The Chronicles of Prydain, bombastic, yet of a true heart, and a solid friend.

There are sub-plots involving some gamine children, and difficulties in the cabal involving Cabbarus, the villain of the first book.  In the end, good triumphs not by force, but by compromise.  Constantine, the young king, was set up to be killed by his guardian, but ends up being captured.  He and Mickle come to terms, and they draw up a peace treaty to benefit both countries.  Mickle sets up a representative government to reign along with her, but that forces her and Theo to postpone their wedding.

References 

1982 American novels
Novels by Lloyd Alexander
Westmark Trilogy
American children's novels
E. P. Dutton books
1982 children's books